The Lega Nazionale Professionisti Serie A (Italian for National Professionals League Serie A), commonly known as LNPA or Lega Serie A (Serie A League), is the governing body that runs the major professional football competitions in Italy, most prominently the Serie A.

It was founded on 1 July 2010. In the past the television rights of the Serie A clubs were sold separately, and "Serie A" had to financially support Serie B through divided part of the Serie A TV revenues to Serie B clubs. On 30 April 2009, Serie A announced a split from Serie B, when nineteen of the twenty clubs voted in favour of the move. Relegation-threatened Lecce voted against.

The governing body took over most of the competitions formerly held by Lega Calcio, namely Serie A, Coppa Italia, Supercoppa Italiana, and youth competitions Campionato Primavera 1, Coppa Italia Primavera, and Supercoppa Primavera. Serie B is now organised by the Lega Serie B, which was also created in 2010.

Competitions

League 

Serie A counts a total number of 20 clubs. In each season (that starts in August, to end in following May) every club faces the others twice (double round-robin system): once in home stadium and once in the opponents one, for 38 total games (19 for each half). Teams gain 3 points for win and a point for draw: no points are gained for lost matches. Ranking is based on total points: the top-club (with the most points) is crowned Italian champion at the end of season. If two or more teams are equal on number of points, they are ranked by following criteria: head-to-head records (results and points), goal difference in these games, goal difference overall, most goals scored, draw.

The three lowest placed teams are relegated in Serie B, as three other sides (two top-teams and play-off winner) are promoted in order to replace them.

Cup 

The Lega Serie A organizes the main Italian cup competition, the Coppa Italia, which is open also to all Serie B clubs and some clubs from the Serie C and the Serie D.

Super Cup 

The Lega Serie A also organizes the Supercoppa Italiana, a yearly match between the champions of the Serie A and the winners of the Coppa Italia.

Youth competitions 
Youth teams of Lega Serie A clubs play in the Campionato Primavera 1, as well as competing in their own cup competitions, such as the Coppa Italia Primavera and the Supercoppa Primavera.

Footballs 
Nike is the official match football of the Lega Serie A and is used by all 20 teams in league games. The same football is used in all Coppa Italia games and the Supercoppa Italiana.

List of Lega Serie A chairmen
 Maurizio Beretta 2010–2017
 Carlo Tavecchio 2017–2018 (interim commissioner)
 Giovanni Malagò 2018 (interim commissioner)
 Gaetano Miccicchè (2018–2019)
 Mario Cicala (2019) (interim commissioner)
 Giancarlo Abete (2019–2020) (interim commissioner)
 Paolo Dal Pino (2020–)

Official Match Ball
2010–11 Nike T90 Tracer
2011–12 Nike Seitiro
2012–13 Nike Maxim
2013–14 Nike Incyte
2014–15 Nike Ordem 2
2015–16 Nike Ordem 3
2016–17 Nike Ordem 4
2017–18 Nike Ordem 5
2018–19 Nike Merlin
2019–20 Nike Merlin 2
2020–21 Nike Flight
2021–22 Nike Flight 2

References

External links 
 Lega Serie A official website

A
2010 establishments in Italy
Serie A
Professional sports leagues in Italy